Lock and Dam No. 4 is a lock and dam located near Alma, Wisconsin and Kellogg, Minnesota on the Upper Mississippi River around river mile 752.8. The lock and dam are owned and operated by the St. Paul District of the United States Army Corps of Engineers-Mississippi Valley Division.

History

The lock and dam was constructed and placed in operation in May 1935. There were ten major injuries and three deaths recorded during construction of the facility. Its last major rehabilitation was from 1988 to 1994.

See also
Lake Pepin, located above Lock and Dam No. 4
Upper Mississippi River National Wildlife and Fish Refuge

References

External links

U.S. Army Corps of Engineers, St. Paul District: Lock and Dam 4
U.S. Army Corps of Engineers, St. Paul District: Lock and Dam 4 brochure

Mississippi River locks
Driftless Area
Buildings and structures in Buffalo County, Wisconsin
Buildings and structures in Wabasha County, Minnesota
Transportation in Wabasha County, Minnesota
Dams in Minnesota
Dams in Wisconsin
United States Army Corps of Engineers dams
Transport infrastructure completed in 1935
Roller dams
Gravity dams
Dams on the Mississippi River
Mississippi Valley Division
Historic American Engineering Record in Minnesota
Historic American Engineering Record in Wisconsin
Locks of Minnesota
Locks of Wisconsin